VVI may stand for:

 Variable-voltage inverter, a type of variable-frequency drive system
 Venevisión International, a global television network broadcasting Spanish content
 Vermont Volunteer Infantry Regiments, a group of infantry regiments in the Union Army during the American Civil War 
 Vertical velocity indicator, also known as variometer
 Viad Corp. (NYSE code: VVI), a marketing company 
 Vinnie Vincent Invasion, an American glam metal band
 Viru Viru International Airport (IATA code: VVI), an aviation facility in Bolivia 

es:VVI
nl:VVI